Edwin Bernard Broderick (January 16, 1917 – July 2, 2006) was an American prelate of the Roman Catholic Church. He served as Bishop of Albany from 1969 to 1976.

Early life and education
Edwin Broderick was born in the Bronx, New York, to Patrick S. and Margaret M. (née O'Donnell) Broderick. His father was a member of the New York City Fire Department who later died during a Mass celebrated by his son in 1948. Broderick received his early education at the parochial school of  St. Anselm Church in the Bronx, graduating in 1930. He attended Regis High School in New York City from 1930 to 1934, and then began his studies for the priesthood at Cathedral College, where he remained for two years. He continued his studies at St. Joseph's Seminary in Yonkers.

Priesthood
On May 30, 1942, Broderick was ordained a priest by Cardinal Francis Spellman at St. Patrick's Cathedral. His first assignment was as a curate at Nativity of Our Blessed Lady Church in the Bronx. He then taught history at Cardinal Hayes High School from 1943 until 1947, when he was assigned to the staff of St. Patrick's Cathedral. In 1951, he earned a doctorate in English from Fordham University in 1951. That same year, he was named the first archdiocesan director of radio and television; during his tenure he created the Catholic Apostolate of Radio, TV and Advertising. He was made the U.S. representative to the Pontifical Commission for Television by Pope Pius XII in 1954.

From 1954 to 1964, Broderick served as secretary to Cardinal Spellman. He served in this capacity together with Father Patrick Ahern for several years. He was named rector of St. Joseph's Seminary in 1964.

Episcopal career
On March 8, 1967, Broderick was appointed auxiliary bishop of the Archdiocese of New York and titular bishop of Thizica by Pope Paul VI. He received his episcopal consecration on the following April 21 from Cardinal Spellman, with Bishops Terence Cooke and George Henry Guilfoyle serving as co-consecrators, at St. Patrick's Cathedral. At his consecration, he wore the same vestments used by Paul VI in his Mass at Yankee Stadium in October 1965. As an auxiliary bishop, he continued to serve as rector of St. Joseph's Seminary, a post which he held until 1969.

Following the death of Bishop William Scully, Broderick was appointed the eighth Bishop of Albany on March 19, 1969. In 1970, he joined Governor Nelson Rockefeller in speaking out in favor of state aid to parochial schools. He served on the court-appointed Citizens' Committee that investigated the 1971 Attica Prison riot.

Director of Catholic Relief Services
On June 3, 1976, Broderick resigned as Bishop of Albany in order to assume the position of executive director of Catholic Relief Services. When he became head of CRS, he jokingly called the agency "the best kept secret in the American Catholic Church." He increased awareness of CRS throughout the U.S. Catholic community; he sponsored short films, new publications, and three telethons that were hosted by such entertainers as Arthur Godfrey, Buddy Hackett, and Trini Lopez. He also established the agency's first direct mail appeal to donors.

During his seven-year tenure, Broderick restructured the governance of CRS and increased the involvement of the laity in its operations. He also launched Operation Rice Bowl, one of the most successful programs in the agency's history. Under his guidance, CRS responded to numerous crises throughout the world, including the 1976 Angolan Civil War, the 1977 cyclone in India that left two million people homeless, the Cambodian genocide that lasted from 1975 to 1979, and civil war in Afghanistan and Lebanon. He resigned as executive director in 1983.

Later life and death
Broderick spent his retirement in Manhattan, and administered Confirmation in many parishes. In 2005, he moved to Teresian House in Albany, where he later died at age 89.

References

External links
Diocese of Albany

Roman Catholic bishops of Albany
1917 births
2006 deaths
People from the Bronx
Fordham University alumni
20th-century Roman Catholic bishops in the United States